Luis David Perdomo (born May 9, 1993) is a Dominican professional baseball pitcher for the Chiba Lotte Marines of Nippon Professional Baseball (NPB). He has previously played in Major League Baseball (MLB) for the San Diego Padres and Milwaukee Brewers.

Professional career

St. Louis Cardinals organization
Perdomo signed with the St. Louis Cardinals as an international free agent in November 2010. He made his professional debut in 2011 with the Dominican Summer League Cardinals. After spending 2012 and 2013 with Rookie League clubs, in 2014 Perdomo made 2 starts with the Class A-Short Season New York–Penn League State College Spikes and 11 starts with the Class A Midwest League Peoria Chiefs, putting up a 4.43 ERA between the two levels.  In 2015, Perdomo started the year with the Chiefs. He was named the Cardinals Minor League Baseball Pitcher of the Month for May, posting a 1.42 ERA and striking out 33 in  innings. In July, he was the Cardinals representative at the All-Star Futures Game, taking the place of the injured Alex Reyes.  After posting a 3.68 ERA in 17 starts with the Chiefs, Perdomo was promoted to the Class A-Advanced Palm Beach Cardinals in August, where he made 5 starts and had a 5.13 ERA.

Perdomo was selected by the Colorado Rockies in the 2015 Rule 5 draft, and then traded to the San Diego Padres for a player to be named later or cash considerations.

San Diego Padres
As a Rule 5 selection, Perdomo was added to the Padres bullpen for 2016 despite being hit hard in Spring Training and never having pitched above the A-Advanced level.  He was moved into the rotation in June as the Padres lost other starting pitchers to trades or injuries.  On August 28, he threw his first complete game, earning a 3–1 victory over the Miami Marlins.  Perdomo finished the season with a 9–10 record and a 5.71 ERA, although he improved over the season and had a better ERA as a starter (4.85) than as a reliever (9.10).

Perdomo was named the Padres fifth starter coming out of Spring Training in 2017.  After missing some time with a sore shoulder in April, Perdomo remained in the starting rotation for the remainder of the year.  He posted an 8–11 record and a 4.67 ERA in 29 starts, with 118 strike-outs in  innings pitched.  He was 3rd on the club in innings pitched, behind Clayton Richard and Jhoulys Chacín, and led the National League in ground ball rate.

Perdomo won a spot in the Padres' 2018 starting rotation. On April 11 of that year, in a game against the Colorado Rockies, Perdomo threw a pitch behind Nolan Arenado, causing Arenado to charge towards Perdomo. Perdomo flung his glove at Arenado and dodged in a split second to avoid the tackle, leading to a bench-clearing brawl. On April 13, Perdomo was suspended for five games. He was placed on the disabled list on July 28 with a right shoulder strain. He ended the season 1–6 in 12 appearances (10 starts). He had an ERA of 7.05 in  innings. In 2019, Perdomo pitched exclusively out of the bullpen, totaling 47 appearances while making just 1 start. He was 2–4 with an even 4.00 ERA.

In mid-October 2020, Perdomo underwent Tommy John surgery. On November 20, 2020, the Padres designated Perdomo for assignment.

Milwaukee Brewers
On December 16, 2020, Perdomo signed a minor league contract with the Milwaukee Brewers organization. He did not play in a game in 2021 as he recovered from injury. He was assigned to the Triple-A Nashville Sounds to begin the 2022 season.

On May 6, 2022, Perdomo was selected to the 40-man and active rosters. On November 18, 2022, Perdomo was non-tendered and became a free agent.

Chiba Lotte Marines
On January 13, 2023, Perdomo signed with the Chiba Lotte Marines of Nippon Professional Baseball (NPB). The contract came with a $1.3 million guarantee and incentives that can boost the total to $1.8 million.

See also
Rule 5 draft results

References

External links

 

1993 births
Living people
Dominican Republic expatriate baseball players in the United States
Dominican Summer League Cardinals players
Gulf Coast Cardinals players
Johnson City Cardinals players
Major League Baseball pitchers
Major League Baseball players from the Dominican Republic
Milwaukee Brewers players
Palm Beach Cardinals players
Peoria Chiefs players
San Diego Padres players
State College Spikes players
El Paso Chihuahuas players
Gigantes del Cibao players
Nashville Sounds players